Rave-up Tonight is the ninth EP by Japanese electronicore band Fear, and Loathing in Las Vegas. It was released on 15 January 2014 through VAP. It features remixes of songs from Dance & Scream, Nextreme, and All That We Have Now. The EP debuted at number 3 on Oricon chart with sales of 19,409 copies in Japan in its first week release. A music video of "Rave-up Tonight" was nominated for the 2014 Space Shower Music Awards for Best Video category. The song was used as the theme song for arcade game Mobile Suit Gundam: Extreme Vs. Maxi Boost.

Track listing

Personnel
Fear, and Loathing in Las Vegas
 So – clean vocals, backing unclean vocals, programming
 Minami – unclean vocals, rapping, keyboards, programming
 Sxun – lead guitar, backing vocals
 Taiki – rhythm guitar, backing vocals
 Kei – bass
 Tomonori – drums, percussion

Charts

Song

Certifications

Awards and nominations

References

External links
 

Fear, and Loathing in Las Vegas (band) albums
2014 EPs
Dubstep EPs
Electronic EPs
Post-hardcore EPs